W. B. Yeats was an Irish poet and playwright.
 
Yeats may also refer to:
 Yeats (surname), a surname and list of people with the name
 Yeats (crater), an impact crater on Mercury
 Yeats (horse), an Irish Thoroughbred racehorse

See also
 Alexander Yeats, a ship wrecked in 1896 at Gurnard's Head
 LÉ William Butler Yeats (P63), an offshore patrol vessel of the Irish Naval Service
 MV W.B. Yeats, a car ferry owned by Irish Ferries
 Yeat, an American rapper
 Yates (disambiguation)
 Yeates
 W. B. Yeats bibliography, the oeuvre of W. B. Yeats, or a part thereof